Heuningvlei is a village in Joe Morolong Local Municipality in the Northern Cape province of South Africa. The name means "the hollow of the bees where water gathers".

Heuningvlei was formerly owned by Turner & Newall. Blue asbestos was mined at Heuningvlei until 1979, and many local residents suffer from asbestos-related diseases.

References

Populated places in the Joe Morolong Local Municipality